Hand Me Down My Old Walking Stick is the twelfth solo studio LP album by Big Joe Williams, originally released in 1969. The album was made from a series of solo recordings in October 1968.

Track listing
UK version

Personnel
 Big Joe Williams – 9-string guitar, vocals
 Mike Batt – producer
 Andrew Lauder – coordinator
 Roy Fisher – coordinator
 Tony McPhee – coordinator, sleeve notes
 Mike Hasted– photography

References

External links
 

1969 albums
Big Joe Williams albums
Blues albums by American artists
Delta blues albums